The Armed Forces of the Principality of Serbia or Army of the Principality of Serbia, known as the Serbian Military or Serbian Army, was the armed forces of the Principality of Serbia.

Founded in 1830, it became a standing army to take part to the First and Second Serbo Turkish Wars of 1876-1878, the first conflict in the nation modern history, after which the country gained its full independence. It was succeeded by the Royal Serbian Army.

Establishment
A small army was established in 1830 after the Russian victory over the Ottomans in the Russo-Turkish War (1828–29), and the signing of the Treaty of Adrianople (1829), which re-guaranteed the autonomy of Serbia as per the earlier Akkerman Convention (1826). Serbia's professional army came out of the personal guard that Prince Miloš Obrenović created in 1830. The first army law of 1839 established that force to 4,000 men and 63 officers. Most officers had attended military schools in Russia, France or Austria. A military academy known as the Artillery School was created on 18 September 1850, its first students graduated in 1855. 
When Mihailo Obrenović became Prince after his brother's abdication in 1861, he created a National Militia. Serbia's People Army added up to 125,000 men in July 1876 at the start of the First Serbian–Ottoman War.

Serbian officers participated in the Serb uprising of 1848–49 and the Herzegovina uprising (1875–1877).

History

Army of Miloš Obrenović (1830-1838) 
Principality of Serbia gained its autonomy from the Ottoman Empire after the Second Serbian Uprising (1815), and officially became an Ottoman client state under the Russian protectorate in 1830. The first Serbian regular military units were formed by Prince Miloš Obrenović in 1825, formally as a police force called Enlisted Watchmen, in order not to offend the Ottoman authorities. At first, there were 12 companies (1,147 men) of these mercenaries. In 1830. Serbia was officially permitted by the Ottomans to form an army, and by 1838. Serbia had 2,417 professional (regular) soldiers, armed and uniformed in the European fashion, trained by the former Austrian and Russian officers. Serbian army had 2 battalions (8 companies) of infantry, two units of artillery (4 batteries), a squadron of cavalry and military musicians - in all, 40 officers, 144 NCOs, 208 cavalry, 195 cannoniers and 1,830 infantrymen. In 1838. Serbia formed the first Military Headquarters and Military Commissariat.

Army of Aleksandar Karađorđević (1842-1858) 
Regular army was temporarily disbanded by the new Serbian Government, led by the leading bureaucrats who exiled Prince Miloš im 1839, but was reformed in 1845. under the name of Garrison Soldiers: there were 2 battalions of infantry (8 companies, 2,010 men), one artillery unit (250 men), one squadron of cavalry (208 men) and 50 musicians, with the officers in all about 2,529 men.

As the Regular Army was too small to protect the country from its powerful neighbours (Austria and Ottoman Empire), during the crisis of Hungarian Revolution of 1848, when Serbia was directly threatened by the Austrian invasion, Serbian government resorted to enlistment of all the men available for the military service, the so-called People's Militia. At the time Serbia was (on paper) able to rise 94,000 men (16,000 horsmen), with 40,000 more in reserve, but there was not enough arms nor food for so many. Conscripts were expected to provide their own weapons and clothing, receiving only food and ammunition from the government. In reality, not even half of them had working rifles, mostly old flintlock muskets of the Ottoman and Austrian production.

In 1856-1858 Serbia imported the first 7.000 modern percussion rifles, Francotte rifle model 1849/56 from Belgium.

The first military schools and factories 
In order to modernize Serbian army, in 1848. Serbian Government built the first Cannon Foundry and State Arsenal in Belgrade, with the main production facilities in Kragujevac. In 1850. government founded Artillery School in Belgrade, which was the foundation of the Serbian Military Academy. After the Russian defeat in Crimean War (1853-1856), Serbia was made a joint protectorate of Russia, Austria, France and United Kingdom by the treaty of Paris (1856).

In 1855. the Cannon Foundry in Kragujevac opened a rifle-production department, working on adaptation of old flintlock muskets to percussion system, with the capacity od 60 muskets a day. The same year two machines for making Minnie balls were imported from Belgium, and in 1857. Kragujevac Foundry installed the machines for production of copper percussion caps, making Serbia finally independent in the production of percussion rifle ammunition. In 1858. a new production line with 28 skilled workers under the guidance of Mihailo Cvejić was set up for converting some 15.000 old flintlock muskets to percussion system: in the first year only some 1,800 rifles were converted, then the production increased to 1.000 addapted rifles a month, so by 1863. Serbian army had some 15.000 converted percussion muskets.

Army of Mihailo Obrenović (1860-1868) 

In 1858. Prince Miloš Obrenović returned to power in Serbia with the support of France and Russia, who were dissatisfied with the pro-Austrian policy of the Serbian government. His son and heir, Prince Mihailo (ruled 1860–67), led a very ambitious foreign policy, aimed at the liberation of all the South-Slavic peoples.  In 1861. Prince Mihailo founded Ministry of War (led by French colonel Hyppolyte Mondain), doubled the size of the Regular Army (to 3,529 men) and declared the foundation of the Serbian National Militia, which conscripted all the men aged 20–50 for the compulsory military service. People's Militia was divided into the First (men under the age of 35) and the Second class, organized into territorial battalions (62 in number) and regiments (17, one in each county). There were also 17 squardons of cavalry, 17 pioneer units of 60 men each, and 6 artillery batteries (1,200 men). The First class could field about 50,000 men, the Second about 40,000. Every county had its own military department, with several regular officers and NCOs, who organized recruitment, supplies, armament and training of National Militia. Military training was done on Sundays and holidays: battalions trained for 2 days every other week, and regiments 15 days a year. NCOs and officers under the rank of captain were selected from the common people, mostly peasants, by the county elders, battalion and squadron commanders were selected by the Minister of War, and regimet commanders were appointed by the Prince. Military service was without pay, and militiamen were expected to provide their own weapons and clothing.

In 1862. Serbian People's Militia existed on paper only: less than a half of the militiamen had serviceable rifles. Hovever, in 1863. Serbia received some 31.000 (or 39.200) old percussion muskets from Russia (Russian musket model 1845): these muskets vere converted to rifles in Kragujevac and became the standard weapon of the National Militia. In 1866. new military schools were opened in Beograd and Kragujevac, to provide Militia officers with basic training in tactics, fortification and topography. In 1867. the first Serbian breechloading rifles (Green model 1867) were made in Belgrade Arsenal, converting some 27,000 Austrian decommissioned Lorenz rifles.

Army of Milan Obrenović (1868-1882) 
During the reign of Prince Milan Obrenović (1868-1889, King of Serbia since 1882), modernisation of the Serbian army continued. In 1870, the Serbian army adopted new, much better breechloading rifles (Peabody model 1870), converting some 28.000 Belgian percussion rifles. In 1874, the. Regular Army was raised to a division (4 battalions of infantry, 1 artillery brigade, 1 battalion of engineers, 2 cavalry squadrons and telegraph command, in all 5.000 men), National Militia was formed in brigades (18 in total, one for each county) and more educated officers were hired. Serbian army had 317 officers (5 colonels, 12 lieutenant-colonels, 20 majors and only one general, Milivoje Petrović Blaznavac).

For the war against the Turks in 1876–1878, in 1876. Serbia mobilised 158 infantry battalions of the First (men aged 20–35) and the Second class (men aged 35–50), 18 battalions of the Third class (men over 50), 18 squadrons of cavalry, 44 batteries with some 210 cannons (only one battery of modern Krupp breachloaders), 6 engineer and 6 medic companies, in all some 130,000 men, 22,000 horses and 6,000 oxen. It was a tremendous effort for the country of 1,300,000 inhabitants.

In 1876, Serbian armament was already obsolete: only the First class soldiers were fully armed with breechloading rifles (in fact converted muzzleloaders Peabody model 1870), and the Second class only partially (with Green model 1867), while the rest were armed with old percussion rifles and even flintlock muskets (Third class).  During the war, more than 6.000 Green rifles were converted to Peabody action: however, in 1877. Serbian army still had some 12.000 Green rifles in service. After the war all of them were converted to much better Peabody action.

After 1880. Serbian Peabody rifles were mostly replaced with 100.000 more modern bolt-action Mauser-Koka rifles imported from Germany.

Only the First class militiamen had complete, state-issued uniforms: the Second and Third class soldiers wore their own civilian clothes.

Wars

Notes

References

Sources
 
 
 
 
 
 
 
 Stanojević, Danilo. Zlatiborci u vojsci Kneževine Srbije: 1815–1878. Istorijski Arhiv, 2008.
 Đorđević, Branislav D. "Training of the Serbian Army." Vojno delo 51.5-6 (1999): 149–165.
 Đukić, Slobodan. "Contribution of the Military Academy to the development of military theory in Serbia in the second half of the 19th century and the first decade of the 20th century." Vojno delo 67.5 (2015): 401–425.

External links
 

Principality of Serbia
History of the Serbian Army